Sportitalia is an Italian terrestrial and satellite television channel owned by Italian Sport Communication, specialized in sports broadcasting 24 hours a day. Sports broadcast include soccer, basketball, tennis, cycling, volley, motoristic sports, rugby, wrestling; information about other sports (winter sports, badminton, boxe, golf, surf, skate, swimming, boating, canoe/Kayak, American football, baseball and cricket) is also provided.

It is broadcast FTA on DTT in Italy channel 60 on Mux DFree, in HD in HbbTV mode and streaming. On 1 August 2020 Sportitalia 1, 2 and 24 returned on DTT in Italy in national free-on-air on Mux Dfree.

Story
The channel's origins stem after the decision of the Italian Competition Authority, an Italian organism that checks positions of privileges at favour of a firm, to subordinate the creation of SKY Italia to the transfer of the frequencies of the two analogue codified channels possessed by Tele+, Tele+Bianco and Tele+Nero.

The financier Tarak Ben Ammar bought the frequencies in collaboration with the satellite channel Eurosport. The frequencies became of property at 51% of the Holland Coordinator and Service, Tarak Ben Ammar's firm, and at 49% of the TF1 Group, principal commercial French TV channel, which also owns Eurosport. Subsequently, in 2004 Tarak Ben Ammar successfully lobbied the then Italian Communications Minister Maurizio Gasparri for a decree allowing him to convert the concessions from crypted TV to free TV: here, then, Sportitalia.

Seen the excellent share of the first 18 months of the channel, other two DTT channels were created: Si Live 24, an all sports news channels 24 hours a day, and Si Solo Calcio, an all soccer channel (both channels transmits some matches of "Serie B", the Italian Second Division, in exclusive, free with the DTT technology); Si Live 24 became first Sportitalia 24 and now Sportitalia 2, and Si Solo Calcio ended its transmissions.

Starting from 6 January 2006 Sportitalia entered in SKY Italia platform and from 16 May 2006 stopped the analogue transmissions.

From 01:00 AM to 07:00 AM (CET) Sportitalia simulcast NBA TV every nights.

Programming 
 Campionato Primavera 1 (2023-2024, all exclusive matches)
 Coppa Italia Primavera (exclusive until 2024)
 Supercoppa Primavera (exclusive until 2024)
 Serie D (2021/22 live)
 Allsvenskan (2021 live)
 Scottish Cup (2020/21 live)
 Ukrainian Premier League (2021/22 live, Shakhtar Donetsk matches)
 A-League (2021/22 live)
 Saudi Professional League
 Copa de la Liga Profesional (2021 live)
 Argentine Primera División (2021 live)
 Campeonato Brasileiro Série A (2021 live)
 Campeonato Carioca (2021 live)
 NASCAR Cup Series
 NASCAR Xfinity Series
 NASCAR Camping World Truck Series

Footnotes

External links

Official Site 
Sport Italia 
NBA on Sportitalia 
WWE on Sportitalia 
Sportitalia on YouTube
Sportitalia on Videodiretta

Italian-language television stations
Television channels in Italy
Television channels and stations established in 2004
2004 establishments in Italy
Sports television in Italy
Television channels and stations disestablished in 2013